Clare Hendra is a New Zealand international lawn and indoor bowls player.

Bowls career
Hendra became a national champion after winning the fours event, playing with Sandra Keith, Selina Smith and Tayla Bruce, at the 2020 New Zealand National Bowls Championships. She was later named as the New Zealand Female Emerging player of the year.

In 2022, she was selected by New Zealand as a reserve for the 2022 Commonwealth Games in Birmingham, England.

In January 2023, Hendra won a second national title, when winning the women's pairs title with Tayla Bruce. She then participated in her first World indoor bowls championship, competing in the singles and mixed pairs at the 2023 World Indoor Bowls Championship.

Working life
Hendra works as a data analyst manager for the Ministry of Education.

References

Living people
New Zealand female bowls players
21st-century New Zealand women
Sportspeople from Upper Hutt
Year of birth missing (living people)